Pallas may refer to:

Astronomy
 2 Pallas asteroid
 Pallas family, a group of asteroids that includes 2 Pallas
 Pallas (crater), a crater on Earth's moon

Mythology
 Pallas (Giant), a son of Uranus and Gaia, killed and flayed by Athena
 Pallas (son of Evander), a prominent character in the Aeneid
 Pallas (son of Lycaon), a teacher of Athena
 Pallas (son of Pandion), the father of the 50 Pallantides
 Pallas (Titan), the son of Crius and Eurybia, brother of Astraeus and Perses, and husband of Styx
 Pallas (daughter of Triton)
 Pallas, an epithet of Athena
 Pallas, the father of Euryalus by Diomede

People
 Pallas (freedman) or Marcus Antonius Pallas, a freedman and favorite of Emperor Claudius
 Pallas, a secondary wife of Herod the Great; her origins and fate are unknown.

People with the surname
 David Pallas (born 1980), Swiss footballer
 Janette Pallas
 José Ignacio Pallas (born 1983), Uruguayan football defender
 Maria Pallas (born 1993), Estonian swimmer
 Peter Simon Pallas (1741–1811), German naturalist
 Paulí Pallàs (1862-1893) Spanish anarchist
 Simon Pallas (1694–1770), German physician
 Theodoros Pallas (born 1949), Greek football player
 Tim Pallas (born 1960), Australian politician

Ships 
 Pallas-class frigate, a 1791 class of frigates on the Royal Navy during the French Revolutionary and Napoleonic Wars
 Pallas-class frigate (1808), a class of 40-gun frigates of the French Navy during the Napoleonic Empire period
 MV Empire Tulip or MV Pallas, a 1939 Dutch coastal tanker
 MV Pallas, a 1971 cargo ship
 Pallas, a French Minerve-class submarine
 Pallas, a Russian barque, wrecked in 1895 after grounding on The Gwineas in the English Channel

Other uses
 PALLAS, a research group at University of California, Berkeley
 Pallas (band), a British rock band
Pallas University of Applied Sciences, a university in Estonia
 Pallas, a townland in Durrow, County Westmeath, Ireland
 Pallas, a 1993 novel by L. Neil Smith
 Pallas, a series of luxury versions of the Citroën DS and other Citroën automobiles
Pallas, an Estonian art society which founded the Pallas Art School (1919–1940)
 Pallas, the designation of a  Citroën DS car model.
Pallas Projects/Studios, a contemporary art space in Dublin, Ireland.

See also
 List of figures in Greek mythology named Pallas
 Pallas Athena or Athena, an ancient Greek goddess associated with wisdom, handicraft, and warfare
 Pallas-Yllästunturi National Park, a park in Finland
 Pallasgreen, a village in County Tipperary, Ireland
 Pallastunturi, a group of fells in Finland
 Pallas's cat, a species of small wild cat
 Pallas's fish eagle, endangered old-world, (Haliaeetus leucoryphus)
 Sailor Pallas, a character in Sailor Moon
 Pallas' reed bunting, a species of bird